Aphanizomenon is a genus of cyanobacteria that inhabits freshwater lakes and can cause dense blooms. They are unicellular organisms that consolidate into linear (non-branching) chains called trichomes. Parallel trichomes can then further unite into aggregates called rafts. Cyanobacteria such as Aphanizomenon are known for using photosynthesis to create energy and therefore use sunlight as their energy source. Aphanizomenon bacteria also play a big role in the Nitrogen cycle since they can perform nitrogen fixation. Studies on the species Aphanizomenon flos-aquae have shown that it can regulate buoyancy through light-induced changes in turgor pressure. It is also able to move by means of gliding, though the specific mechanism by which this is possible is not yet known.

Ecology

Overcoming phosphate limitation
Aphanizomenon may become dominant in a water body partially due to their ability to induce phosphate-limitation in other phytoplankton while also increasing phosphate availability to itself through release of cylindrospermopsin.  The cylindrospermopsin causes other phytoplankton to increase their alkaline phosphatase activity, increasing inorganic phosphate availability in the water to Aphanizomenon during times when phosphate becomes limiting.

Photosynthesis 
All species in the cyanobacteria phylum can perform photosynthesis. They use a similar photosynthesis to plants, using two photosystems which is called the Z-scheme. This is different from other photosynthetic bacteria that only use one photosystem and do not have thylakoids. Cyanobacteria species such as Aphanizomenon also use Oxygen as their final electron acceptor in the Electron Transport Chain, which is also different from other photosynthetic bacteria, which perform a type of photosynthesis called anoxygenic photosynthesis.

Nitrogen fixation
Aphanizomenon are a special type of cyanobacteria called heterocysts, which are capable of producing biologically useful nitrogen (ammonium) by the process of  nitrogen fixation from atmospheric nitrogen.

A large proportion (between 35 and 50%) of fixed nitrogen may be released into the surrounding water, providing an important source of biologically available nitrogen to the ecosystem. Since Aphanizomenon are one of the few species of bacteria that can perform nitrogen fixation, other bacterial species that use nitrogen ions as a reactant will start to rely on the species as a source of usable nitrogen. This will cause a bacterial bloom to form, which is a condition under which the number of bacterial colonies in a area will suddenly increase.

Algal blooms 
Aphanizomenon can produce algal blooms from producing usable nitrogen causing other bacterial species to form colonies around the Aphanizomenon. Algal Blooms formed from Aphanizomenon species tend to be very toxic and create a variety of toxins. These blooms may also create dead zones in the water. This ends up being bad for the ecosystem, since it can hurt many of the plants and animals living around it.

Toxin production
Aphanizomenon species may produce cyanotoxins including cylindrospermospin (CYN), lipopolysaccharides (LPS), anatoxin-a, saxitoxin and BMAA. Though not all Aphanizomenon produce cyanotoxins, many do. CYNs are a toxin that is especially toxic for the liver and kidney, thought to inhibit protein synthesis. LPSs are found in the cellular membrane of gram-negative bacterial cells and is released when the cellular membrane is degraded. The releasing of LPSs in animals can cause a severe immune response causing it to be very toxic for animals. Anatoxin-a is a type of anatoxin, it is normally released during algal blooms in lakes, causing exposure to animals around it. Anatoxin-a is toxic to the nerves in animals and is very lethal to humans with a lethal dose thought to be less than 5mg. Similarly to anatoxin-a, BMAAs are another type of neurotoxin that lingers inside animals for longer than anatoxin-a. It will keep affecting animals even after a algal bloom dies down. Last, saxitoxins is yet another type of neurotoxin known to be released by a species of Aphanizomenon. It interrupts nerve transmissions to and from the brain, causing it to be very toxic.

Colony formation

Aphanizomenon may form large colonies as a defense against herbivore grazing, especially Daphnia in freshwater.

See also
Anatoxin (disambiguation)
Cylindrospermopsin
Saxitoxin
Cyanotoxin

References

Nostocales
Cyanobacteria genera